A Rose for Her Grave and Other True Cases is the first book in author Ann Rule's Crime Files Series. Released in 1993 by Pocket Books, the book details Randy Roth, who murdered two of his wives for insurance money, as well as other cases, including those of Dick Marquette, a convicted Oregon serial killer.

Critical reception 
Publishers Weekly, in its August 1993 review, wrote that "Rule discusses the effect of the individual case on her feelings about capital punishment and other issues, and her unwavering voice presents even the most gruesome details rationally."

The Library Journal's Ben Harrison wrote in 1993 that Rule's accounts of the crimes "present the female victims as real people who deserve compassionate treatment."

Awards 
In 1994, the book won Bouchercon's Anthony Award for Best True Crime.

Film adaptation 
In 2023, Lifetime released a television movie loosely based on the book, starring Colin Egglesfield, Laura Ramsey, and Chrishell Stause.

References

External references 
 Simon and Schuster's book page

Anthony Award-winning works
Non-fiction crime books
1993 non-fiction books
Simon & Schuster books
Books by Ann Rule